Kathy Louise Keller (born 1950) is an author, lecturer, church founder, and Christian theologian from New York City who has appeared on the New York Times best seller list. She is the wife of pastor Tim Keller of New York's Redeemer Presbyterian Church, which the couple co-founded.

Early life, education, and correspondence with C.S. Lewis
Kathy Keller (Kristy) was born in Pittsburgh, Pennsylvania to Mary Louise Stephens and Henry R. Kristy (Kristolich), a Westinghouse Electric Company executive and World War II pilot of Croatian descent. Keller grew up in Monroeville, Pennsylvania with her four siblings. When she was twelve years old, she corresponded with Oxford University theologian C.S. Lewis and their correspondence was later published. She graduated from Gateway High School  She then received a B.A. in English from Allegheny College in 1972 where she was active in campus ministry.

Marriage to Tim Keller, career, and founding Redeemer
In 1975 she received a  Master of Theological Studies (M.T.S.) summa cum laude from Gordon Conwell Theological Seminary in Massachusetts where she met her future husband, Tim Keller. They married shortly before graduation in January 1975 at Crossroads Presbyterian Church in Monroeville. The Kellers helped lead a Presbyterian church in Hopewell, Virginia before moving to Philadelphia where Kathy Keller served as an editor at Great Commission Publications, and her husband taught at Westminster Theological Seminary. In 1989 the Kellers founded Redeemer Presbyterian Church in New York City, a Presbyterian Church in America (PCA) congregation, which became one of the most influential churches in America. Besides being a co-founder, Kathy served in various roles at Redeemer including on the Communication Committee and Assistant Director of Communication and Media and the editor at Redeemer. She has three adult sons.

Writings
Kathy Keller has authored numerous theological books, most importantly "Jesus, Justice and Gender Roles" and, with her husband, The Meaning of Marriage (2013), (a New York Times best seller). She has also co-authored with her husband God's Wisdom for Navigating Life; and The Songs of Jesus and The Meaning of Marriage Devotional. Keller has also published many articles, including pieces in the New York Times and has been featured in various media sources including Christianity Today and ABC News Nightline.

References

Calvinist and Reformed writers
Presbyterians from New York (state)
1950 births
Living people
Allegheny College alumni
Gordon–Conwell Theological Seminary alumni
American women memoirists
American memoirists
Women motivational writers
Presbyterian Church in America members
American people of Croatian descent
21st-century American women